Davis v. County School Board of Prince Edward County (Docket number: Civ. A. No. 1333; Case citation: 103 F. Supp. 337 (1952)) was one of the five cases combined into Brown v. Board of Education, the famous case in which the U.S. Supreme Court, in 1954, officially overturned racial segregation in U.S. public schools. The Davis case was the only such case to be initiated by a student protest. The case challenged segregation in Prince Edward County, Virginia.

Background
R.R. Moton High School, an all-black high school in Farmville, Virginia, founded in 1923, suffered from terrible conditions due to underfunding. The school did not have a gymnasium, cafeteria or teachers' restrooms. Teachers and students did not have desks or blackboards, and due to overcrowding, some students had to take classes in an immobilized, decrepit school bus parked outside the main school building. The school's requests for additional funds were denied by the all-white school board.

In response, on April 23, 1951, a 16-year-old student named Barbara Rose Johns, who was the niece of Vernon Johns, the famous black Baptist preacher and civil rights leader, covertly organized a student general strike.  She forged notes to teachers telling them to bring their students to the auditorium for a special announcement. When the school's students showed up, Johns took the stage and persuaded the school to strike to protest poor school conditions. Over 450 walked out and marched to the homes of members of the school board, who refused to see them and instead threatened them with expulsions. This led to a two-week protest from students.

Further details about this story can be found in Taylor Branch's Parting The Waters, America In The King Years 1954-63, published by Simon and Schuster in 1988. This book mentions that the headmaster was told over the phone that the police were about to arrest two of his students at the bus station. He failed to recognize this call as a ruse, so he went to town. Only thereafter were notes calling to a special assembly delivered to the classroom. When the headmaster returned, he tried to talk the students out of striking, but they refused.

This book also gives a different account of the  teaching conditions. It states that some classes were held in "three temporary tar-paper shacks" built to house the overflow at the school. It was so cold during the winter that teachers and students had to keep their coats on. No classes held in a school bus are mentioned, although the school's bus is said to be hand-me-down from the white school, and was driven by the history teacher.

The trials
On May 23, 1951, two lawyers from the NAACP, Spottswood Robinson and Oliver Hill, filed suit on behalf of 117 students against the school district to integrate the schools.  The district was represented by T. Justin Moore, Archibald G. ("Archie") Robertson and John W. Riely of the Hunton, Williams, Gay, Powell and Gibson, a large Virginia law firm, with its primary office in Richmond (now known as Hunton & Williams). J. Lindsay Almond, as Attorney General, represented the Commonwealth of Virginia. The first plaintiff listed was Dorothy E. Davis, a 14-year old ninth grader. The case was titled Dorothy E. Davis, et al. versus County School Board of Prince Edward County, Virginia.

The students' request was unanimously rejected by a three-judge panel of the U.S. District Court. "We have found no hurt or harm to either race," the court ruled. The case was then appealed to the U.S. Supreme Court and consolidated with four other cases from other districts around the country into the famous Brown v. Board of Education case. In it, the US Supreme Court ruled that segregation in public education was, effectively, unconstitutional and illegal.

The Aftermath

The ruling was extremely unpopular among white Virginians and a considerable number of them attempted to resist integration through every means possible, during a period known as Massive Resistance. Schools remained segregated for several years. By 1959, J. Lindsay Almond had become Governor of Virginia, and faced with continuing losses in the courts, he dismantled the system of segregated schools in that state. Nevertheless, the Board of Supervisors for Prince Edward County refused to appropriate any funds for the County School Board at all, effectively closing all public schools rather than integrate them. White students often attended "segregation academies", which were all-white private schools that were formed. Black students had to go to school elsewhere or forgo their education altogether. Prince Edward County schools remained closed for five years, from 1959 to 1964.

In 2008, the case and the protest which led to it were memorialized on the grounds of the Virginia State Capitol in the Virginia Civil Rights Memorial.

See also 
 Griffin v. County School Board of Prince Edward County
 List of landmark African-American court cases
 Stanley Plan

Further reading 

 https://www.encyclopediavirginia.org/moton_school_strike_and_prince_edward_county_school_closings

References 

1954 in United States case law
1954 in Virginia
African-American history of Virginia
Civil rights movement case law
Education in Prince Edward County, Virginia
Legal history of Virginia
United States equal protection case law
United States school desegregation case law
United States Supreme Court cases
United States Supreme Court cases of the Warren Court